Marc Lieb (born 4 July 1980) is a former German Porsche factory motor-racing driver. He won the FIA GT Championship in 2003 and 2005, and the European Le Mans Series in 2005, 2006, 2009 and 2010. He won the 24 Hours Nürburgring four times, one time the 24 Hours of Le Mans in 2016, in the 2008 12 Hours of Sebring, in the 2003 24 hours of Spa and in the 2007 Petit Le Mans. He is also the 2016 FIA World Endurance Champion.

Career
Born in Stuttgart, Lieb started racing in karts in 1992.  In 1995, he moved to cars, racing in the German Formula Renault 1800 championship.  He finished 2nd in the championship the next year.  In 1998, he moved to German Formula Renault 2000.  In 1999, he finished 3rd in the Formula Renault Eurocup.  In 2000, Lieb became a Porsche Junior driver, and raced in the Porsche Carrera Cup, finishing 5th in the championship.  In 2001, he finished 7th in Carrera Cup, and also scored a podium in Porsche Supercup.

In 2002, Lieb won the Carrera Cup championship with 4 wins.  He also took 2 N-GT wins in the FIA GT Championship, at Brno and Enna-Pergusa.  He raced at the 12 Hours of Sebring and Petit Le Mans as well, but failed to finish either race.  For 2003, Lieb became a full Porsche factory driver, and raced in FIA GT.  He won the N-GT championship, driving with Stéphane Ortelli for Freisinger Motorsport.  Along the way, he won 3 races, including winning the Spa 24 Hours outright in his Porsche 911 GT3-RS.  He also finished 2nd in the GT class at the 24 Hours of Le Mans.

In 2004, Lieb raced in the American Le Mans Series with Romain Dumas for Alex Job Racing.    Lieb started the season finishing 2nd in class at Sebring, and finished 4th in the championship after taking wins at Portland and Laguna Seca.

After the 2004 season Lieb commenced studies in engineering at the University of Applied Sciences in Esslingen, combining his education with a reduced factory programme with Porsche. Lieb had previously studied automotive and motor engineering at the University of Stuttgart for two semesters before choosing to focus on racing. Lieb completed his degree at Esslingen after seven semesters of study and has subsequently combined his racing with a role as an engineer at Porsche Motorsport's workshop in Weissach.

In 2005 Lieb returned to the FIA GT Championship where he won the GT2 Drivers title with Mike Rockenfeller for GruppeM Racing, netting a class win at the Spa 24 Hours along the way. He also raced in the Le Mans Endurance Series, winning three of four races and the championship with Sebah Automotive. Lieb also won the GT2 class at the 24 Hours of Le Mans with Mike Rockenfeller and Leo Hindrey.  In 2006, he won the Le Mans Series GT2 championship with Joël Camathias, driving for Autorlando Sport.

In 2007 and 2008 Lieb drive for Team Felbermayr-Proton in the Le Mans Series with a Porsche 911 GT3-RSR (2008).

In 2009, Lieb teaming up with Richard Lietz in the Porsche 911 of Felbermayr Proton in the European Le Mans Series. He won the GT2 class championship with three wins in five rounds. On his return to the 24 Hours of Le Mans, who ran for Felbermayr-Proton alongside Lietz and Henzler, had to retire. He also disputed the round of Zolder for the FIA GT Championship for Prospeed, which finished 8th with Darryl O'Young. Instead, he earned his third victory in the 24 Hours Nürburgring for Manthey. In the American Le Mans Series, was 4th in Sebring and 5th Petit Le Mans as third driver of Bergmeister and Patrick Long Flying Lizard, and came 2nd at the time of Miller with Henzler for Farnbacher-Loles' team, always in a Porsche 911 GT2 class.

Lieb and Lietz successfully defended the  drivers and teams titles of GT2 class in the 2010 Le Mans Series, with three wins against two semiofficials' Ferrari F430 of AF Corse. Also, he earned his second victory in the GT2 class at the 24 Hours of Le Mans, once again alongside Lietz and Henzler in the Porsche 911 Felbermayr-Proton. Lieb returned with Bergmeister and Long for Flying Lizard in the two main races of the American Le Mans Series: Sebring finished 4th and 5th at Petit Le Mans. Returned to the 24 Hours of Spa as Prospeed driver, accompanying Marc Goossens, Marco Holzer and Westbrook in a Porsche 911 GT2 class, in this occasion the principal during the race, but abandoned.

Lieb continued contesting the European Le Mans Series in 2011 for the Felbermayr-Proton team. He and Lietz managed two podiums but neither wins in five rounds, so that finished 5th in the drivers' championship and 3rd in the teams championship of the renowned GTE-Pro category. Counting with Henzler as third driver for the fourth consecutive year, finished 4th in the GTE-Pro class at the 24 Hours of Le Mans. In their participation in the 12 Hours of Sebring for Flying Lizard, again accompanying a Bergmeister and Long, finished in 6th position. No raced Petit Le Mans, although in the 24 Hours of Daytona, where he finished 6th in the GT class in a Brumos' Porsche 911. He also returned to win the 24 Hours of Nürburgring for Manthey, forming crew Bernhard, Dumas and Luhr. He also returned to pair with Alex Davison, but this time at the invitation of V8 Supercars to drive a Ford Falcon in Surfers Paradise Grand Prix, he finished 23rd and 18th in each race.

In 2012, Felbermayr-Proton left the European Le Mans Series for the World Endurance Championship. Lieb continued teaming up with Lietz in the team. He earned two wins and six podiums in eight races, whereby Felbermayr-Proton finished 3rd in the teams championship and Porsche concluded second in the manufacturers championship. Also finished 3rd in the 24 Hours of Daytona, again in the Brumos' Porsche 911. On the other hand, returned to Surfers Paradise but this time he drove a Holden Commodore, finishing 2nd in the first round and 14th in the second.

Porsche officially entered in the 2013 World Endurance Championship, Lieb and hired to drive one of the new Porsche 911 of Manthey alongside Lietz. Both, along with Dumas, won the 24 Hours of Le Mans, and captured five 4th-place finishes, one 5th-place finish as well as one 6th-place finish, counting as third driver a Dumas in the first three rounds. Thus, was fifth in the Drivers' Championship, and third in the teams and makes. Also came 2nd overall in the 24 Hours of Spa, and finishing 7th overall in the 24 Hours of Nürburgring and first in the SP7 class, also with Manthey. On the other hand, ran in the 24 Hours of Daytona with Brumos' Porsche 911, and the three rounds of minimatch resistance of V8 Supercars Holden Commodore with Jonathon Webb.

Porsche then announced after the conclusion of the 2013 season that Lieb would be joining the Porsche 919 Hybrid LMP1 program for the 2014 WEC.

As of 4 September 2013, Lieb set a lap time of 6:57 in Porsche's 918 Spyder around the Nürburgring Nordschleife. This is currently the third fastest official lap time from a street legal vehicle to go round the ring.

Career Accolades
Spa 24 Hours overall winner: 2003
FIA GT Championship N-GT/GT2 champion: 2003, 2005
24 Hours of Le Mans GT2 class winner: 2005, 2010, 2013
Spa 24 Hours GT2 class winner: 2005
Le Mans Series GT2 champion: 2006
24 Hours Nürburgring 2007 champion, 2008 champion, 2009 champion, 2011 champion
Le Mans Series 2007 vice champion
24 Hours of Le Mans: Overall Winner 2016

24 Hours of Le Mans results

Complete FIA World Endurance Championship results

Complete V8 Supercar results

+ Not Eligible for points

Bathurst 1000 results

Complete Bathurst 12 Hour results

References

External links
Official website
Porsche bio
Proton Felbermayr

German racing drivers
Sportspeople from Stuttgart
German Formula Renault 2.0 drivers
24 Hours of Le Mans drivers
24 Hours of Le Mans winning drivers
American Le Mans Series drivers
European Le Mans Series drivers
Living people
24 Hours of Daytona drivers
1980 births
Supercars Championship drivers
Racing drivers from Baden-Württemberg
Rolex Sports Car Series drivers
Porsche Supercup drivers
FIA World Endurance Championship drivers
International GT Open drivers
Blancpain Endurance Series drivers
WeatherTech SportsCar Championship drivers
24 Hours of Spa drivers
Asian Le Mans Series drivers
Porsche Motorsports drivers
Stone Brothers Racing drivers
Nürburgring 24 Hours drivers
Porsche Carrera Cup Germany drivers